Raymond Hartley was an English professional association footballer who played as a wing half. He played one match in the Football League Third Division North for Nelson in the 1921–22 season.

References

English footballers
Association football defenders
Nelson F.C. players
Year of birth missing
Year of death missing